Admiral The Hon. William John Ward (9 December 1829 – 20 November 1900) was a Royal Navy officer who became Admiral Superintendent of the Malta Dockyard.

Naval career
Born the son of Edward Southwell Ward, 3rd Viscount Bangor, Ward joined the Royal Navy in 1843. Promoted to rear admiral on 23 July 1880, he became Admiral Superintendent of the Malta Dockyard in March 1885. He was promoted to vice admiral on 7 July 1886 and to full admiral on 5 April 1892.

References

Royal Navy admirals
1829 births
1900 deaths